Alpine skiing at the 1986 Asian Winter Games took place in Sapporo, Japan from 4 to 6 March 1986 with four events contested — two each for men and women.

Medalists

Men

Women

Medal table

References

 
1986 Asian Winter Games events
1986
1986 in alpine skiing